Vijay Gohil (born 13 October 1995) is an Indian cricketer. He made his first-class debut for Mumbai in the 2016–17 Ranji Trophy on 6 October 2016. He made his List A debut for Mumbai in the 2018–19 Vijay Hazare Trophy on 19 September 2018.

References

External links
 

1995 births
Living people
Indian cricketers
Mumbai cricketers
Cricketers from Mumbai